The Artemis program is a human spaceflight program by the United States. Missions in the program are aimed at exploration of the Moon, including crewed and robotic exploration of the lunar surface. Three flights of the Orion Multi-Purpose Crew Vehicle are currently planned for launch in the Artemis program in the early 2020s, beginning with Artemis 1. Before Artemis was named, the flights were referred to as "Orion missions". Numerous supporting scientific and technology demonstration missions are planned for launch under the program's Commercial Lunar Payload Services (CLPS), in addition to planned and proposed uncrewed logistical missions to construct and resupply the Gateway and its expendable and reusable lunar landers in lunar orbit.

Main missions

Support missions

Technology demonstrations

Launched on 28 June 2022, the Cislunar Autonomous Positioning System Technology Operations and Navigation Experiment ("CAPSTONE") mission is a small (25 kg) technology-demonstration spacecraft designed to test a low-energy trans-lunar trajectories and to demonstrate the near-rectilinear halo orbit (NRHO) intended to support lunar polar missions.

Surface missions 

The Commercial Lunar Payload Services (CLPS) program will support the Artemis program by landing several small payloads focused on scouting for lunar resources, in situ resource utilization (ISRU) experiments and lunar science, in preparation for an extended human presence on the lunar surface.

Logistics missions 

Uncrewed missions to assemble and resupply the Gateway will be executed as part of the Artemis program.

See also 

 List of Apollo missions
 List of Constellation missions
 List of Space Shuttle missions

Notes

References

External links 
 Artemis program at NASA

Missions
Artemis
Artemis